Winford is a hamlet on the Isle of Wight which since the 1950s and particularly in the late 1970s has seen considerable housing development. The local shop in Forest Road closed some time ago, but tourist attractions with gift shops are situated nearby. It is in the civil parish of Newchurch.

The pipes supplying Winford with water are being replaced as part of a massive upgrading of the infrastructure supplying water to the Isle of Wight. In addition, two huge pipes supplying the Isle of Wight with water from the mainland of England are being replaced, and water pipelines are being extended in the south of the Island.

Southern Vectis bus route 8 and former Wightbus route 23 link Winford with the towns of Newport, Sandown, Shanklin and Ryde, including intermediate villages.

References

External links

Hamlets on the Isle of Wight